Sankowskya is a genus of plants. The sole known species, Sankowskya stipularis, is a tree endemic to one locality in the Wet Tropics rainforests of northeastern Queensland, Australia. The species constitutes part of the plant family Picrodendraceae. Few botanical collections have ever been made of the trees, from a very restricted area of the Wet Tropics rainforests, hence the species has obtained the conservation status of "endangered" in the legislative regulation of the Queensland Government's Nature Conservation Act 1992. 
Notably, trees grow naturally in the Thylogale Nature Refuge.

See also
Taxonomy of the Picrodendraceae

References

Picrodendraceae
Monotypic Malpighiales genera
Flora of Queensland
Taxa named by Paul Irwin Forster